This is a list of films which have placed number one at the weekend box office in the Netherlands during 2009.

See also
List of Dutch films - Dutch films by year

Notes

References
 Note: Click on the relevant weekend to view specifics.

Netherlands
2009
2009 in the Netherlands